Lakshman Singh (born c.1952) is an Indian golfer who won the individual gold medal for India at 1982 Asian Games. He was awarded Arjuna Award in 1982. He hails from Rajasthan state. His sons, Arjun Singh and Ranjit Singh have also represented India in golf. He is popularly known as Bunny Lakshman Singh.

References 

RCGC upsets: Doha Games medallist duo crashes out

Indian male golfers
Asian Games gold medalists for India
Asian Games medalists in golf
Golfers at the 1982 Asian Games
Medalists at the 1982 Asian Games
Golfers from Rajasthan
Recipients of the Arjuna Award
Rajasthani people
Living people
Year of birth missing (living people)